Cineto Romano is a  (municipality) in the Metropolitan City of Rome in the Italian region of Latium, located about  northeast of Rome. It was named Scarpe until 1882.

It was a fief of the Orsini in the 11th century, then of the Borghese. Main sights include the baronial Castle and the church of San Giovanni Battista (13th century).

References

Cities and towns in Lazio
Castles in Italy